Matthew Ian Senreich (born June 17, 1974) is an American screenwriter, television producer, director, and voice actor best known for his work with animated television series Robot Chicken, which he co-created with business partner and close friend Seth Green.

Early life 
Born to a Jewish family, Senreich graduated from Herricks High School in New Hyde Park, New York.

Career 
In 1996, Senreich was employed by Wizard Entertainment, gradually rising to become its editorial director. In 1996 or 1997, Senreich met Green when the actor, a fan of Wizard magazine, responded enthusiastically to an interview request. With Green, Senreich created in 2000 and 2001 Sweet J Presents, a web-based series of animated shorts presented on screenblast.com. Adult Swim contracted the Robot Chicken series on the basis of these shorts.

Stoopid Monkey 
Senreich and Green together run the production company Stoopid Monkey. His Emmy nominations were shared with other key members of the  production staff of Robot Chicken, including partner Seth Green, for "Outstanding Animated Program (For Programming Less Than One Hour)" in 2007, 2008, and 2009. Senreich received an Emmy Award for Outstanding Short-Format Animated Program (shared with key members of his production staff) at the 62nd annual Emmy Award ceremony held on August 29, 2010.

Senreich along with Tom Root have created Titan Maximum, a television series on Adult Swim, that premiered on September 27, 2009.

Filmography

Television

References

External links
 

1974 births
Living people
American magazine editors
American sketch comedians
American television producers
American television writers
Annie Award winners
Jewish American screenwriters
American male television writers
People from Long Island
Showrunners
Primetime Emmy Award winners
21st-century American Jews
Herricks High School alumni